Statistics of Empress's Cup in the 1999 season.

Overview
It was contested by 18 teams, and Tasaki Perule FC won the championship.

Results

1st round
JEF United Ichihara 1-3 YKK Tohoku LSC Flappers
Osaka University of Health and Sport Sciences 4-2 NTV Menina

2nd round
Prima Ham FC Kunoichi 3-0 YKK Tohoku LSC Flappers
Urawa Reinas FC 3-1 Sapporo Linda
OKI FC Winds 5-0 Toyama Ladies SC
Matsushita Electric Panasonic Bambina 11-0 Hiroshima Oko FC
NTV Beleza 16-0 Socius Amigo
Takarazuka Bunnys 1-0 Fukuoka Jogakuin FC
Nippon Sport Science University 0-1 Suzuyo Shimizu FC Lovely Ladies
Osaka University of Health and Sport Sciences 0-4 Tasaki Perule FC

Quarterfinals
Prima Ham FC Kunoichi 5-0 Urawa Reinas FC
OKI FC Winds 1-3 Matsushita Electric Panasonic Bambina
NTV Beleza 3-1 Takarazuka Bunnys
Suzuyo Shimizu FC Lovely Ladies 0-2 Tasaki Perule FC

Semifinals
Prima Ham FC Kunoichi 6-0 Matsushita Electric Panasonic Bambina
NTV Beleza 1-1 (pen 3-4) Tasaki Perule FC

Final
Prima Ham FC Kunoichi 0-0 (pen 2-4) Tasaki Perule FC
Tasaki Perule FC won the championship.

References

Empress's Cup
1999 in Japanese women's football